Fong Yee Pui (born December 24, 1991, in Hong Kong) is a Hong Konger sprinter.  She competed in the 100 metres competition at the 2012 Summer Olympics; she ran the preliminaries in 12.02 seconds, qualifying her for Round 1, and Round 1 in 11.98 seconds, which did not qualify her for the semifinals.

References

1991 births
Living people
Hong Kong female sprinters
Olympic athletes of Hong Kong
Athletes (track and field) at the 2012 Summer Olympics
Athletes (track and field) at the 2014 Asian Games
World Athletics Championships athletes for Hong Kong
Asian Games competitors for Hong Kong
Olympic female sprinters